Linktree is a freemium social media reference landing page developed by Alex Zaccaria, Anthony Zaccaria, and Nick Humphreys, headquartered in Melbourne Australia. Founded in 2016, it serves as a landing page for a person or company's entire associated links in social media, which rarely allows linking to multiple sites. The site was inspired by the developers' annoyance with social media that can't allow multiple hyperlinks.

History 
Linktree was established in 2016, out of annoyance regarding social media that does not allow multiple hyperlinks in profiles. The site was created in six hours. It is reported to have gained 3,000 users overnight, which caused the server to crash due to overload. In 2018, Instagram banned the site due to "spam", although it was lifted and Instagram issued an apology. In December 2018, the number of users reached 1 million, then 3 million by the end of 2019. By October 2020, Linktree had gained more than 8 million users.

As of March 2021, the number of users reached nearly 16 million, with an increase of 300% over the previous year.

In August 2021 Linktree announced the acquisition of smart link provider Odesli to become a "one-stop-shop" for musicians seeking to monetize their art.

Features and subscriptions 
Linktree is a freemium service: it is free, but also offers a 'Pro' subscription launched in April 2017, which gives more benefits, such as more customization options, more detailed analytics, email sign-up integration, removal of the Linktree logo, etc. Users can upload as many links as they wish despite not subscribing. Pro analytics allows users to view their click-through rates. Both offerings allow users to create a personalized and customizable page, that houses all social media links and official websites. Linktree also partnered with Amazon, allowing users to upload their Amazon store profile as an affiliate link. Amid the George Floyd protests, Linktree allowed users to adopt a 'Support Anti-Racism' icon, which pops a tab linking visitors to articles to further understand racism, organizations to donate to, and places to protest.

Accolades 
In 2019, Linktree was included in CNBC's 'Upstart 100' list of "brightest, most intriguing, young startups promising to become the great companies of tomorrow." In March 2020, Fast Company placed Linktree as fourth place in the 'Most Innovative Companies of 2020' list in the 'Social media' category for "making Instagram's 'link in bio' into a sleek menu for sharing articles, merch, or paid partnerships." For comparison's sake, in that year the first place was Cameo and the third Pinterest; while the fourth place of other years were Reddit (2018 and 2021), Are.na (2019) and Genies, Inc. (2022).

Continuous Instagram bans 
It is reported that Linktree, started as a link-in-bio tool for Instagram, was banned from Instagram in 2018, since it is noted as "breaking the community standards," specifically as a spam website.  Linktree stated that they were "working on it" with their "representatives on Instagram." This ban resulted in improving the relationship between Linktree and Instagram after thousands of users advocated on Linktree's behalf. Although the ban has been lifted and Instagram has issued an apology, rumors circulated in 2019 stating that Instagram would issue another ban. As of March 2021, Instagram accounts for less than 40% of Linktree's profile traffic.

Funding 
On October 27, 2020, Linktree announced that it had received US$10.7 million in Series A financing from Airtree Ventures and Insight Partners. The funding is the company's first from an institutional investor. On March 26, 2021, Linktree announced the closing of a $45M Series B financing round. The round was co-led by Index Ventures and Coatue, with participation from returning investors AirTree Ventures and Insight Partners.
After raising $110M in January 2022, and offering to pay its employees $6,000 in a yearly bonus, the company announced it would fire 17% of its workforce citing changing dynamics. It did not reveal cash on hand.

See also 

 Online advertising
 Ad serving

References 

Social media
Online services
Business services companies established in 2016
Online advertising services and affiliate networks
Companies based in Melbourne
Companies based in Sydney
Australian companies established in 2016